Corey Michael Cott (born March 30, 1990) is an American actor and singer. He is best known for playing Jack Kelly in the Broadway musical Newsies, replacing Jeremy Jordan, and for originating the role of Donny Novitski in the Broadway musical Bandstand.

Early life and education
Cott was born in Columbus, Mississippi, the oldest of three children of Rick, an investment manager and former Air Force fighter pilot, and Lori Cott. The older brother of actor Casey Cott, he grew up in Spring Arbor, Michigan and Chagrin Falls, Ohio, where he attended Chagrin Falls High School. After high school, he graduated from the Carnegie Mellon School of Drama in Pittsburgh, Pennsylvania.

Career
Cott began his professional acting career while attending Carnegie Mellon, booking shows with Pittsburgh's professional theater company Pittsburgh CLO. He had roles in their productions of Miss Saigon, Jekyll and Hyde, and Jesus Christ Superstar.

Soon after graduating from Carnegie Mellon University, Cott moved to New York City. Shortly thereafter, he booked the role of the Jack Kelly alternate in the Broadway musical Newsies. He took over that role permanently on September 5, 2012.

Cott appeared in the musical Bandstand, which opened on Broadway on April 26, 2017, as WWII veteran Donny Novitski. He had also starred in the musical's premiere at the Paper Mill Playhouse in October 2015.

On February 25, 2019, Cott was announced as part of the cast of the Fox drama Filthy Rich, playing Eric Monreaux. Filthy Rich premiered on September 21, 2020.

Personal life
Cott married Meghan Woollard in January 2013. They met while singing in church in Pittsburgh. Their first child, a son, Elliott Michael, was born on May 1, 2017. In August 2019, they welcomed their second son, Nolan. On October 31, 2021, the couple welcomed their third son, Asher.

Cott grew up with Ben Fankhauser, a fellow Newsies co-star. They performed together in several local youth theatre productions.

Stage credits

Filmography

References

External links
 
 
  (archive)

1990 births
Living people
21st-century American male actors
American male child actors
American male film actors
American male musical theatre actors
American male stage actors
American male television actors
Carnegie Mellon University College of Fine Arts alumni
Male actors from Cleveland
People from Columbus, Mississippi
People from Jackson County, Michigan
People from Chagrin Falls, Ohio